Kaniów  is a village in the administrative district of Gmina Popielów, within Opole County, Opole Voivodeship, in south-western Poland.

The village is traditionally inhabited by the Leśnioki ethnographic subgroup of the Polish people.

History
In the Middle Ages, the village was part of Piast-ruled Poland, and afterwards it was also part of Bohemia (Czechia), Prussia and Germany. During World War II, the Germans operated a forced labour camp for Jews and the E608 forced labour subcamp of the Stalag VIII-B/344 prisoner-of-war camp in the village. The village was restored to Poland after the defeat of Nazi Germany in World War II in 1945.

References

Villages in Opole County